Gonzo Station was a U.S. Navy acronym for "Gulf of Oman Naval Zone of Operations" or "Gulf of Oman Northern Zone." It was used to designate an area of carrier-based naval operations by the U.S. Navy and U.S. Marine Corps in the Indian Ocean during the 1979-1981 Iranian Hostage Crisis and the "Tanker War" between the United States and the Islamic Republic of Iran.

Carriers deployed 
Multiple aircraft carriers, their associated air wings and carrier battle groups, and associated sea-based and land-based task forces and task groups served on Gonzo Station.
 

 exceeded Midways record at sea in May 1980 with 144 days at sea. In 1984 Midway was on station for 111 days.

While replenishment ships normally rotated on and off the line in order to resupply,  served in formation for 180 days, and  served in formation for 78 days.

In 1980, the Dwight D. Eisenhower served 315 days of deployed sea time with a consecutive 154-day line period. This was the largest deployment of US Navy ships to the Indian Ocean since World War II.

See also
 Operation Eagle Claw
 Operation Earnest Will
 Operation Prime Chance
 Yankee station

References

United States Navy